Jothe Jotheyali is a 2006 Indian Kannada-language romance film directed by Dinakar Thoogudeepa and produced by Meena Thoogudeepa. The film stars Prem and Ramya. The music for the movie was composed by a debutante music composer V. Harikrishna.

Plot
Nakul (Prem) and Divya (Ramya) are married couples on the verge of divorce. As the movie starts both of the lead characters arrive at the Family court, to seek divorce. The actual movie unfolds in Flashback scenes as both remember - how they met and fell in love. They also face parental opposition for their marriage and they eventually marry against their wish and start a separate life altogether with their friends. Prem then starts an advertising firm. He is helped by Darshan Thoogudeep (in a mini guest appearance playing himself) for his first ad and eventually he becomes quite successful in his profession. He starts to neglect Divya and due to some mis-understanding is found with his colleague in a compromising position. Thus Divya abandons him and moves out of their home and goes to live with her parents. Prem tries unsuccessfully to woo Divya back with many tricks which fall flat and cause more tension on their relationship. Finally Divya understands her husband and returns to their home to see him in bed with another woman - which is the last blow for their relationship.

In the climax, Prem and Ramya are granted Divorce. While they are leaving the court, a criminal tries to flee from the policemen taking Divya as hostage, Prem fights to free her from the criminal and is stabbed to death. By now Divya realises Prem's true love for her and confesses the same at the hospital.

Cast
 Prem as Nakul
 Ramya as Divya
 Sharan as Prem's friend
 Tharun Sudhir as Prem's friend
 Dwarkish as Divya's father
 Thulasi Shivamani as Divya's mother
 Avinash as Nakul's father
 Malathi Sardeshpande as Nakul's mother
 Darshan in a cameo appearance

Soundtrack

V. Harikrishna composed the film's background score and music for its soundtrack, with its lyrics written by V. Nagendra Prasad. The soundtrack album consists of six tracks.

Reception
The movie ran to 100 days, even though directed by a debutante. People flocked to theaters to see wonderful chemistry between the lead pair Ramya and Prem. The comedy by Sharan was also a plus point for the movie. Song of the movie were quite a rage and V Hari Krishna became a popular music Director after this movie. He also became permanent music Director for the Thoogudeepa Productions banner and henceforth for all movies acted by Darshan Thoogudeep

Critical reception
Jothe Jotheyali received average to negative reviews from critics upon release on 22 September 2006. R.G. Vijayasarathy of Rediff gave the film one out of five stars and noted that the film lacked a good story and neat narration. Nowrunning gave the film a rating of 2/5 and commented that even though the music of the film was good, it lacked a good story and narration.

External links 

2000s Kannada-language films
2006 films
Films set in Bangalore
Films scored by V. Harikrishna
Films directed by Dinakar Thoogudeepa